Peter Milton Hayek (November 16, 1957 – December 3, 2021) was an American professional ice hockey defenseman who played in one National Hockey League game for the Minnesota North Stars during the 1981–82 season, on December 10, 1981 against the Detroit Red Wings. He played his college hockey at the University of Minnesota under Herb Brooks. He won the 1979 NCAA Championship and was on the roster (JV team) for the 1976 Championship. He later coached youth hockey in Minnesota. Hayek died on December 3, 2021 from dementia.

Career statistics

Regular season and playoffs

See also
 List of players who played only one game in the NHL

References

External links
 

1957 births
2021 deaths
American men's ice hockey defensemen
Baltimore Clippers (1979–81) players
Birmingham South Stars players
Deaths from dementia in Minnesota
Ice hockey people from Minneapolis
Minnesota Golden Gophers men's ice hockey players
Minnesota North Stars players
Nashville South Stars players
NCAA men's ice hockey national champions
Oklahoma City Stars players
Sports coaches from Minneapolis
Undrafted National Hockey League players